Melanthio (before 1927: Ζαμπύρδενη - Zampyrdeni;) is a village in Kastoria Regional Unit, Macedonia, Greece.

The Greek census (1920) recorded 592 people in the village and in 1923 there were 600 inhabitants (or 70 families) who were Muslim(Mostly Albanians). Following the Greek-Turkish population exchange, in 1926 within Zampyrdeni there were 69 refugee families from Pontus. The Greek census (1928) recorded 320 village inhabitants. There were 72 refugee families (309 people) in 1928.

References

Populated places in Kastoria (regional unit)